Sengamalapatti is a village panchayat located in the Virudhunagar district of Tamil Nadu state, India. Chennai is the state capital for Sengamalapatti village. It is located around 484.3 kilometer away from Sengamalapatti. The native language of Sengamalapatti is Tamil and most of the village people speak Tamil. Sengamalapatti people use Tamil language for communication.

Sengamalapatti village is located in the UTC 5.30 time zone and it follows Indian Standard Time (IST). Sengamalapatti sun rise time varies 18 minutes from IST. The vehicle driving side in Sengamalapatti is left, all vehicles should take left side during driving. Sengamalapatti people are using its national currency which is Indian Rupee and its international currency code is INR. Sengamalapatti phones and mobiles can be accessed by adding the Indian country dialing code +91 from abroad. Sengamalapatti people are following the dd/mm/yyyy date format in day-to-day life. Sengamalapatti domain name extension( country code top-level domain (cTLD)) is .in.

References

Telugu Tamil Street
Commucative Street

Villages in Virudhunagar district